The 2005 Carolina Challenge Cup was a four-team round robin pre-season competition hosted by the Charleston Battery. It was the second edition of the tournament.

Teams
Four clubs competed in the tournament:

Standings

Matches

Scorers
3 goals
Brad Davis (San Jose Earthquakes)
2 goals
Jaime Moreno (D.C. United)
1 goal
Edson Buddle (Columbus Crew)
Knox Cameron (San Jose Earthquakes)
Christian Gómez (D.C. United)
Boyzz Khamalu (Charleston Battery)
Alejandro Moreno (Columbus Crew)
Mike Petke (D.C. United)
Eliseo Quintanilla (D.C. United)
Gregory Simmonds (Charleston Battery)

See also 
 Carolina Challenge Cup
 Charleston Battery
 2005 in American soccer

External links
 Carolina Challenge Cup release and schedule

Carolina
2005
Carolina Challenge Cup
Carolina Challenge Cup